The alternate prime minister of Israel is the de facto deputy of the prime minister of Israel and the second highest ranking cabinet minister, who is designated to replace the prime minister of Israel in a rotation government. The position was created de jure to resolve the 2019–2022 Israeli political crisis, alongside the formal rotation mechanism of the alternation government. It existed de facto in the 1984–88 rotation government, which was established on the basis of a non-binding rotation agreement. According to the Basic Law: The Government, the government swearing-in includes a target date for the prime minister and alternate prime minister to switch their posts. Government ministers report either to the prime minister or the alternate prime minister, with the prime minister being unable to dismiss cabinet ministers reporting to the alternate prime minister without the alternate prime minister's consent.

The most recent alternate prime minister was Naftali Bennett, who served from 1 July to 8 November 2022.

List of alternate prime ministers

De facto

De jure

See also
 Prime Minister of Israel
 Deputy leaders of Israel

Notes

References

 
Lists of government ministers of Israel